Teemenaarus is a monotypic genus of Australian araneomorph spiders in the family Cyatholipidae containing the single species, Teemenaarus silvestris. It was first described by V. T. Davies in 1978, and has only been found in Australia.

References

Cyatholipidae
Monotypic Araneomorphae genera
Spiders of Australia
Taxa named by Valerie Todd Davies